The 2014 University of North Dakota football team represented the University of North Dakota in the 2014 NCAA Division I FCS football season. They were led by first year head coach Bubba Schweigert and played their home games at the Alerus Center. They were members of the Big Sky Conference. They finished the season 5–7, 3–5 in Big Sky play to finish in a tie for eighth place.

Schedule

References

North Dakota
North Dakota Fighting Hawks football seasons
North Dakota football